Irina Sirina (born 7 November 1967 in Nevinnomyssk) is a former Russian and Hungarian international handball player and current goalkeeping coach of Budaörs Handball. She participated at the 2004 Summer Olympics, where she placed fifth with the Hungarian national team. After her retirement in 2007, she is working as goalkeeper coach in Hungary.

References

External links
 Profile on Handball.hu

1967 births
Living people
People from Nevinnomyssk
Hungarian female handball players
Olympic handball players of Hungary
Handball players at the 2004 Summer Olympics